Hemistomia pusillior is a species of minute freshwater snail with an operculum, aquatic gastropod molluscs or micromolluscs in the family Tateidae. This species is endemic to Australia.

References

External links

Hemistomia
Gastropods of Australia
Endangered fauna of Australia
Gastropods described in 1944
Taxonomy articles created by Polbot